The John Philip Sousa House, also known historically as Wildbank, is a historic house at 12 Hicks Lane, overlooking Manhasset Bay, in Sands Point, New York.  Built in 1907, it was the home of composer and bandleader John Philip Sousa (1854-1932) from 1912 until his death.  It was declared a National Historic Landmark in 1966. It is still a private residence and is not open to the public.

Description and history
The John Philip Sousa House is located on a bluff overlooking Manhasset Bay on the North Shore of Long Island in the Sands Point area of North Hempstead.  It is a rambling -story frame structure with a brown stucco exterior and a red tile roof.   Its main block has a gabled roof oriented north–south, with a two-story wing extending east off the northern end.  Porches extend along the western facade of the main block (overlooking the bay) and the south side of the wing.  Outbuildings on the property include a stable and carriage house, an L-shaped structure near Hicks Lane, which has an apartment on the upper level.  Near the waterfront there is a small teahouse.

The house was built in 1907 for architect Alexander Buel Trowbridge as his summer residence.  It was purchased in 1915 by John Philip Sousa, and remained his home until his death in 1932.  During Sousa's ownership, the property was known as "Wildbank".  Sousa was instrumental in elevating wind ensembles and marching bands to a high level of prominence and popularity, both as a conductor of the United States Marine Band, and as the composer of hundreds of marches, many of which remain staples of the band literature.

See also

List of National Historic Landmarks in New York
National Register of Historic Places listings in North Hempstead (town), New York

References

External links
 The Mansion of March King John Philip Sousa

Gallery

Houses on the National Register of Historic Places in New York (state)
National Historic Landmarks in New York (state)
Town of North Hempstead, New York
Houses completed in 1907
Houses in Nassau County, New York
House
National Register of Historic Places in Nassau County, New York